Events from the year 1655 in England.

Incumbents
 Lord Protector – Oliver Cromwell
 Parliament – First Protectorate (until 22 January)

Events
 22 January – Oliver Cromwell dissolves the First Protectorate Parliament.
 11–14 March – Penruddock uprising: a Royalist uprising beginning in Wiltshire is defeated by a skirmish in South Molton.
 28 April – Admiral Robert Blake destroys the pirate fleet of the bey of Tunis.
 10–27 May – Anglo-Spanish War: Invasion of Jamaica – Forces led by William Penn and Robert Venables capture the island of Jamaica from Spain.
 9 August – the Rule of the Major-Generals, a period of direct military government, begins.
 24 November – Anglican services prohibited by Cromwell.
 4–18 December – Whitehall Conference convened by Cromwell to debate the Resettlement of the Jews in England.

Ongoing events
 Anglo-Spanish War 1654–1660

Publications
 John Wallis's Arithmetica Infinitorum, first work on differential calculus.

Births
 11 January – Henry Howard, 7th Duke of Norfolk, politician and soldier (died 1701)
 23 April (bapt.) – Andrew Allam, writer (died 1685)
 25 April – John Lowther, 1st Viscount Lonsdale, politician (died 1700)
 3 June – William Nicolson, bishop and antiquary (died 1727)
 20 July – Ford Grey, 1st Earl of Tankerville, statesman (died 1701)
 12 November – Francis Nicholson, military officer and colonial governor (died 1728)
 28 December – Charles Cornwallis, 3rd Baron Cornwallis, First Lord of the British Admiralty (died 1698)
 Sir John Barker, 4th Baronet, politician (died 1696)

Deaths
 31 January (bur.) – Anthony Stapley, Regicide (born 1590)
 February – George Brydges, 6th Baron Chandos, (born 1620)
 18 March – Father Richard Smith, Bishop (born 1568)
 16 May – John Penruddock, Cavalier (born 1619) (executed)
 after May – Elizabeth Alkin, Parliamentarian publisher, nurse and spy (born c. 1600)
 by 9 June – Thomas Mauleverer, Member of Parliament and Regicide (born 1599)
 26 June – Edward Conway, 2nd Viscount Conway, (born 1594)
 19 November – Stephen Marshall, clergyman (born 1594)

References

 
Years of the 17th century in England